The Last Laugh is a 2016 American documentary film directed by Ferne Pearlstein about whether jokes about the Holocaust can ever be funny.

Synopsis
Is the Holocaust funny? This documentary looks at the taboo topic of humor, delving deep into pop-culture to find out where to draw the line, and whether that is a desirable—or even possible—goal. Much of the film is centered around Auschwitz survivor Renée Firestone who discusses humor in the concentration camps and finding enjoyment in life after the war.

Cast
All appearing as themselves
 Mel Brooks
 Larry Charles
 Robert Clary
 David Cross
 Renée Firestone
 Gilbert Gottfried
 Lisa Lampanelli
 Carl Reiner
 Rob Reiner
 Jeff Ross
 Harry Shearer
 Sarah Silverman

Archive footage
 Jerry Lewis
 Joan Rivers

Release
The Last Laugh premiered at the Tribeca Film Festival on April 18, 2016.

Critical reception
The Last Laugh has earned very high critical praise. The film has a score of 98% on the review aggregator website Rotten Tomatoes, based on 46 reviews. The site's critical consensus reads, "The Last Laugh takes a fresh -- and unexpectedly funny -- approach to sensitive subject matter, uncovering affecting insights about the nature of comedy along the way."

References

External links
 
 

2016 films
2016 documentary films
American documentary films
Documentary films about comedy and comedians
Documentary films about the Holocaust
2010s English-language films
2010s American films